Homaloptera confuzona is a species of hillstream loach in the genus Homaloptera found in Laos, Cambodia and Thailand. It lives in the lower Mekong drainage and coastal streams of Cambodia and eastern Thailand. The maximum size is about  SL.

Homaloptera confuzona is eaten locally. It occasionally occurs in the aquarium fish trade.

References

Homaloptera
Fish of the Mekong Basin
Fish of Cambodia
Fish of Laos
Fish of Thailand
Fish described in 2000